The Show Chart is a music program record chart on SBS M that gives an award to the best-performing single of the week in South Korea.

As of  2023, 3 singles has reached number one on the chart, and 3 acts has been awarded a first-place trophy. "Teddy Bear" by STAYC currently holds the highest score of the year, with 9,360 points on the February 21 broadcast.

Chart history

References 

2023 in South Korean music
2023 record charts
Lists of number-one songs in South Korea